Ilya Andreyevich Samoshnikov (born 14 November 1997) is a Russian football player who plays as a left back for FC Rubin Kazan. He also played in the left midfielder and right back positions.

Club career
Samoshnikov began his football career in the amateur league in Moscow.

He made his debut in the Russian Professional Football League for FC Ararat Moscow on 19 July 2017 in a game against FC Zorky Krasnogorsk.

He made his Russian Football National League debut for FC Shinnik Yaroslavl on 26 August 2018 in a game against FC Baltika Kaliningrad.

On 2 January 2020, he signed with Russian Premier League club FC Rubin Kazan. He made his RPL debut for Rubin on 27 June 2020 in a game against FC Lokomotiv Moscow, as a starter.

International career
He was called up to the Russia national football team for the first time in March 2021 for the World Cup qualifiers against Malta, Slovenia and Slovakia.

On 11 May 2021, he was included in the preliminary extended 30-man squad for UEFA Euro 2020. He was not included in the final squad.

He made his debut for the senior squad on 1 September 2021 in a World cup qualifier against Croatia. He substituted Mário Fernandes in the 78th minute, as the game ended in a 0–0 draw. He made his first appearance in the starting line-up 3 days later in the next qualifier against Cyprus.

Career statistics

Club

Notes

References

External links
 
 
 Profile by Russian Professional Football League

1997 births
Footballers from Moscow
Living people
Russian footballers
Russia international footballers
Association football defenders
Association football midfielders
FC Ararat Moscow players
FC Shinnik Yaroslavl players
FC Torpedo Moscow players
FC Rubin Kazan players
Russian Premier League players
Russian First League players
Russian Second League players